"A Circle in the Fire" is a short story by Flannery O'Connor. It was written in 1954 and published in 1955 in her short story collection A Good Man is Hard to Find. A devout Roman Catholic, O'Connor often used religious themes in her work.

Plot summary 
The story involves Mrs. Cope, the owner of a farm in the South, who is visited by three teenage boys, including Powell Boyd, the son of one of her former farm workers. Mrs. Cope, her workers, and her daughter are all suspicious of the boys. The boys hitchhiked from Atlanta and were hoping to spend some time on the farm and ride her horses during their vacation. Mrs. Cope gives them some food, but discourages them from staying. The boys do not listen to her, riding her horses, messing with cattle and lying to her. She threatens to send him to D.A and tells them she owns the farm and adjacent woods and that they must leave. The story ends with the boys laughing prophetically while setting fire to the woods, and the scene is reminiscent of a story in the Biblical Book of Daniel where the evil King Nebuchadnezzar unsuccessfully attempts to burn three men in a fiery furnace when they refuse to worship the King's idol.

References

Short stories by Flannery O'Connor
1954 short stories